This is a list of West Virginia covered bridges. There are 17 historic wooden covered bridges in the U.S. state of West Virginia. Only three of these bridges were built before 1870 and they are the three longest in the state.  Each uses a standard truss design, braced with the Burr Arch. No one-truss design dominates in the state.  The bridges are located in three general areas.  In the south in Monroe and Greenbrier counties there are about a half dozen bridges within an easy drive of one another.  To the north around Philippi is another group of bridges, including the historic Philippi Covered Bridge which is the longest and an important part of state history for its associations with the American Civil War.

Existing bridges
The following is a list of the 17 extant West Virginia covered bridges.

Former bridges
The following is a list of no longer extant West Virginia covered bridges. A complete  list of covered bridges that have existed at one time or another in the state would exceed 100.

Barbour County
Audra Covered Bridge, 18??, Audra (Burnt, 1940s)

Braxton County
Bulltown Covered Bridge, 1854

Doddridge County
West Union Covered Bridge, 1843 across Middle Island Creek (Destroyed in flood, June 1950).

Greenbrier County
Greenbrier Covered Bridge, 18??, across Greenbrier River; near Lewisburg

Harrison County
Maulsby Covered Bridge, 1848, across West Fork River (part of Weston and Fairmont Turnpike Company)

Lewis County
Weston Covered Bridge, 18??, across Stonecoal Creek, (Chenoweth; destroyed).

Marion County
Paw Paw Creek Covered Bridge, 18??, Grant Town (Destroyed in flood, August 1980)

Monongalia County
Wadestown Covered Bridge, 18??, across the West Virginia branch of Dunkard Creek.

Preston County
Cheat River Covered Bridge (aka Northwestern Turnpike, or Tygart Valley, Bridge), 1835, across Cheat River near Rowlesburg (Burnt, 1964)

Randolph County
Beverly Covered Bridge, 1845, Chenoweth's first bridge (destroyed ca. 1863); part of the Staunton and Parkersburg Turnpike; rebuilt by Chenoweth (1872–73; destroyed again after 1952).
Cheat Bridge Covered Bridge, 1841, across Cheat River at Cheat Bridge (Removed, 1910)

Randolph/Upshur Counties
Middle Fork Covered Bridge, 18??, across Middle Fork River spanning county border (Chenoweth; destroyed).

Taylor County
Valley Bridge, 1834, across Tygart Valley River (part of the Northwestern Turnpike) at Fetterman (Destroyed in flood, 1888).

Upshur County
Buckhannon Covered Bridge, 18?? (Chenoweth; destroyed).

See also

 List of bridges on the National Register of Historic Places in West Virginia
 World Guide to Covered Bridges

References

Citations

Further reading
Auvil, Myrtle (1973), Covered Bridges of West Virginia Past & Present

Maxwell, Hu (1899), The History of Barbour County, West Virginia; page 277, The Philippi Bridge

Notes
 Sorting this column will result in bridges being listed in order by county.

External links

Covered Spans of Yesteryear project
West Virginia Tourism article about the state's covered bridges

Bridges
West Virginia covered bridges
Bridges, covered